Desislava Topalova (also transliterated as Dessislava Topalova, ; born 8 June 1978) is a retired tennis player from Bulgaria.

During her career she won 7 ITF singles titles and reached her career-high singles ranking of world No. 152 on 15 May 2000, whilst her best doubles ranking was No. 184 on 10 September 2001. Topalova was a member of the Bulgaria Fed Cup team between 1997 and the mid 2000s, serving as its captain in the later stages of her career.

ITF Circuit finals

Singles: 12 (7 titles, 5 runner–ups)

Doubles: 17 (9 titles, 8 runner–ups)

References

External links
 
 
 

1978 births
Living people
Sportspeople from Plovdiv
Bulgarian female tennis players